The William Waterman House is a historic house in Coventry, Rhode Island.  It is located on the west side of Rhode Island Route 102, a short way north of its junction with Bowen Hill Road.  The -story wood-frame house was built, probably before 1793, by William Waterman, a descendant of one of Coventry's earliest European settlers.  It is five bays wide, with a large central chimney.  Its entry is the most elaborate part of the main facade, flanked by paired pilasters and sheltered by a barrel-vaulted portico with triangular pediment.

The house was listed on the National Register of Historic Places in 1980.

See also
National Register of Historic Places listings in Kent County, Rhode Island

References

Houses on the National Register of Historic Places in Rhode Island
Houses in Kent County, Rhode Island
Buildings and structures in Coventry, Rhode Island
National Register of Historic Places in Kent County, Rhode Island